Christopher D. Neufeld (born April 21, 1957 in Steinbach, Manitoba) is a Canadian curler from Steinbach, Manitoba. He played second for Vic Peters in the senior division.

Neufeld was raised in Steinbach and attended the Steinbach Regional Secondary School where he met and competed at the high school level with Peters. After moving to Winnipeg and going pro, Neufeld and Peters curled their entire careers together, and during that time won 3 Provincial Championships, 1 National Championship in 1992 and also won the Manitoba Senior Men's Championships in 2008.

Neufeld's sons Denni Neufeld curled with Jason Gunnlaugson and B.J. Neufeld currently curls on the Kevin Koe rink.

Personal life
Neufeld is married and has three children. He now lives in Gimli, Manitoba where he works as a realtor for Interlake Real Estate.

References

External links
 
 Brier Champion List
 Coaching Profile: Chris Neufeld - Curling Canada – 2013 Tim Hortons Roar of the Rings – Canadian Olympic Curling Trials

1957 births
Living people
Brier champions
Canadian curling coaches
People from Gimli, Manitoba
Sportspeople from Steinbach, Manitoba
Curlers from Winnipeg